Germain Adolph Chiniquy (pronounced "chin-a-KEE"; June 23, 1912 – November 22, 1989) was an American animator known for his work with Friz Freleng, at both Warner Bros. and DePatie-Freleng Enterprises.

Chiniquy joined Freleng's animation team in the early 1940s. His work can best be seen in the many "dance numbers" that Freleng liked to use in his shorts. As crewmembers working on Golden Age Warner Brothers's cartoons were seldom credited, Chiniquy and the other animators would often add their names into the backgrounds of cartoons. Chiniquy's name can be seen in Bugs Bunny Rides Again (1948); look for "G. Chiniquy, Blacksmith" painted on a rooftop. Chiniquy also made a cameo appearance in the live action portion of You Ought to Be in Pictures (1940), as the director calling for "Quiet on the set!"

After the original Warner Bros. Cartoon Studio was shut down, Chiniquy animated for commercials at Playhouse Pictures from 1964 to 1965.

Chiniquy followed Freleng to DFE, and soon he was promoted to director. Chiniquy directed many of the theatrical Pink Panther, The Ant and the Aardvark, and Hoot Kloot shorts.

Cartoons 
 The Jetsons
 Hey There It's Yogi Bear!
 Looney Tunes
 Merrie Melodies
 The Transformers
 GI Joe

References

External links 
 
Looney Tunes hidden gags

Animators from Illinois
American animated film directors
1912 births
1989 deaths
Warner Bros. Discovery people
Warner Bros. people
Hanna-Barbera people
Warner Bros. Cartoons people